Johann Andreas Ziegler (11 July 1749 – 18 March 1802) was a German and Austrian painter and copperplate engraver. 
Ziegler was born in Meiningen, and painted primarily landscapes. He traveled Austria and produced a collection of works depicting views of Vienna. 
Ziegler committed suicide in Vienna.

Gallery 
Illustrations from "Fifty Picturesque Views of the Rhine River from Speyer to Düsseldorf," created in the summer of 1792.

Date 1792

References 

1749 births
1802 deaths
18th-century Austrian painters
18th-century Austrian male artists
Austrian male painters
19th-century Austrian painters
19th-century German male artists
18th-century German painters
18th-century German male artists
German male painters
19th-century German painters
Austrian landscape painters
Austrian people of German descent
Artists from Meiningen